Nikolay Sitko (born 9 May 1914, date of death unknown) was a Soviet equestrian. He competed at the 1952 Summer Olympics and the 1956 Summer Olympics.

References

1914 births
Year of death missing
Soviet male equestrians
Olympic equestrians of the Soviet Union
Equestrians at the 1952 Summer Olympics
Equestrians at the 1956 Summer Olympics
Place of birth missing